The 1985 All-Atlantic Coast Conference football team consists of American football players chosen by various selectors for their All-Atlantic Coast Conference ("ACC") teams for the 1985 NCAA Division I-A football season. Selectors in 1985 included the Associated Press (AP).

Four teams dominated the AP's 1985 All-ACC selections:
 Conference champion Maryland finished the season ranked No. 18 in the final AP Poll and placed four players on the All-ACC team: offensive lineman Len Lynch, defensive lineman Bruce Mesner, linebacker Chuck Faucette, and defensive back Al Covington
 Georgia Tech finished the season ranked No. 19 in the final AP Poll and placed three players on the All-ACC team: defensive lineman Pat Swilling, linebacker Ted Roof, and defensive back Cleve Pounds.

Offensive selections

Wide receivers
 James Brim, Wake Forest (AP)
 Earl Winfield, North Carolina (AP)

Tight ends
 Jim Riggs, Clemson (AP)

Offensive linemen
 Jim Dombrowski, Virginia (AP)
 Jim Milinichik, NC State (AP)
 Len Lynch, Maryland (AP)
 Steve Reese, Clemson (AP)
 Harold Garren, Virginia (AP)

Quarterbacks
 Erik Kramer, NC State (AP)

Running backs
 Barry Word, Virginia (AP)
 Kenny Flowers, Clemson (AP)

Defensive selections

Defensive linemen
 Bruce Mesner, Maryland (AP)
 Pat Swilling, Georgia Tech (AP)
 Reuben Davis, North Carolina (AP)
 Gary Baldinger, Wake Forest (AP)

Linebackers
 Chuck Faucette, Maryland (AP)
 Mike Junkin, Duke (AP)
 Ted Roof, Georgia Tech (AP)

Defensive backs
 Cleve Pounds, Georgia Tech (AP)
 Al Covington, Maryland (AP)
 Reggie McCummings, Wake Forest (AP)
 Larry Griffin, North Carolina (AP)

Special teams

Placekickers
 Kenny Stadlin, Virginia (AP)

Punters
 Tommy Barnhardt, North Carolina (AP)

Key
AP = Associated Press selected by a panel of sports writers and broadcasters in the ACC region

References

All-Atlantic Coast Conference football team
All-Atlantic Coast Conference football teams